Hopi-Dart was an American sounding rocket used by the NASA Marshall Space Flight Center for aeronomy studies in the early 1960s.

Design
Hopi-Dart was a two-stage vehicle, combining a solid-fuelled Hopi III first stage with an unpowered Dart second stage. The Hopi-Dart was developed for NASA Marshall Space Fight Center to obtain wind speeds at altitudes from 70 to 90 kilometers in support of Saturn launches. Design was headed by Charles W. Watson.

Operational history
Eleven test and eleven operational aeronomy missions were flown, with Wallops Island, the Tonopah Test Range, and the Cape Canaveral Air Force Station Launch Complex 43 being used as launch sites. Four of the test launches were failures. After flight 18 significant modifications were made. The modifications were to the interstage, propellant formulation, and the rocket nozzle. The redesigned first stage was renamed the Hopi III. Hopi III-Dart was replaced by the Super Loki-Dart of Space Data Corporation.

References
Citations

Bibliography

Sounding rockets of the United States